Marc Weller is Professor of International Law and International Constitutional Studies at Cambridge University, England, and a fellow of Hughes Hall, Cambridge working in its Department of Politics and International Studies (POLIS). He was the Director of the Lauterpacht Centre for International Law. He has been an adviser in many international peace negotiations.

References

External links 
 Department of Politics and International Studies (POLIS) - Prof Marc Weller
 Hughes Hall - Fellow - Marc Weller
 Marc Weller  'Syria air strikes: Were they legal?''  BBC News, (14 April 2018)

Living people
Year of birth missing (living people)